AD 454 was a year of the Julian calendar.

454 may also refer to:
454 BC, a year of the pre-Julian Roman calendar
454 Life Sciences, an American biotech company
.454 Casull, a handgun cartridge
454, a model of the Chevrolet big-block engine